Akinfayoshe Daniel Oturu (born September 20, 1999) is a Nigerian-American professional basketball player for the Windy City Bulls of the NBA G League. He played college basketball for the Minnesota Golden Gophers.

High school career
Oturu played basketball for Cretin-Derham Hall High School in Saint Paul, Minnesota for four years. He grew from 6'6 as a freshman to 6'9 as a junior and developed good hand-eye coordination and navigation on the court. As a senior, he averaged 18.8 points, 11.5 rebounds and 6.1 blocks per game and became his school's all-time leader in each of the three categories. In his final season, Oturu led his team to a Class 4A state championship over Apple Valley High School, scoring a game-winning dunk with 0.5 seconds left in regulation. Despite his strong play, he was excluded from the all-tournament team for sportsmanship reasons, as he had received a technical foul for shoving opposing player, Tre Jones, in the first half. Oturu was invited to play for the World Select team, representing his parents' home country of Nigeria, at the Nike Hoop Summit in Portland, Oregon. He was considered a four-star recruit and committed to play college basketball for Minnesota over offers from Kansas, among others.

College career
Oturu had shoulder surgery prior to his freshman season. On December 24, 2018, Oturu was named Big Ten freshman of the week after scoring 20 points and pulling down 11 rebounds in a 86–67 win over North Carolina A&T. He tied his season-high of 20 points in a 68–64 loss to Rutgers on February 24, 2019. Despite Oturu's strong play, he was not named in the Big Ten Freshman Team, which he cited as motivation. Oturu averaged 10.8 points per game and led Big Ten freshman in rebounding with 7.0 per game, blocked shots with 46, and field goal percentage with 55 percent. In the offseason, Oturu worked on bulking up to help replace the loss of Jordan Murphy. During his sophomore season he was named Big Ten player of the week on December 30, after posting 21 points and a career-high 20 rebounds in an 89–62 win against Florida International, shooting 8-of-12 from the floor. On January 12, 2020, Oturu scored a career-high 30 points in a 75–67 upset of Michigan despite playing with a shoulder injury. He was named Big Ten Player of the Week on January 13. At the close of the regular season, Oturu was named to the Second Team All-Big Ten by the coaches and media and to the All-Defensive Team.

Professional career

Los Angeles Clippers (2020–2021)
Oturu was selected with the 33rd pick in the 2020 NBA draft by the Minnesota Timberwolves, becoming the first University of Minnesota player to be drafted since Kris Humphries in 2004. Oturu was subsequently traded to the Los Angeles Clippers. On November 28, 2020, the Los Angeles Clippers announced that they had signed with Oturu.

Windy City Bulls (2021)
On August 16, 2021, Oturu was traded to the Memphis Grizzlies, who waived him on September 23. Four days later, he signed with the Chicago Bulls, but was waived on October 11. Oturu joined the Windy City Bulls as an affiliate player.

Toronto Raptors (2021–2022)
On December 26, 2021, Oturu signed a 10-day contract with the Toronto Raptors.

Return to Windy City Bulls (2022–present)
On January 3, 2022, Oturu was reacquired and activated by the Windy City Bulls of the NBA G League.

Career statistics

NBA

Regular season

|-
| style="text-align:left;"| 2020–21
| style="text-align:left;"| L.A. Clippers
| 30 || 0 || 5.4 || .423 || .200 || .750 || 1.6 || .3 || .1 || .2 || 1.8
|-
| style="text-align:left;"| 2021–22
| style="text-align:left;"| Toronto
| 3 || 0 || 9.0 || .500 || .000 || .600 || 1.7 || .0 || .0 || .7 || 3.0
|- class="sortbottom"
| style="text-align:center;" colspan="2"| Career
| 33 || 0 || 5.7 || .431 || .167 || .706 || 1.6 || .3 || .1 || .3 || 1.9

Playoffs

|-
| style="text-align:left;"| 2021
| style="text-align:left;"| L.A. Clippers
| 8 || 0 || 1.9 || .400 || .000 || .500 || .5 || .0 || .0 || .1 || .6

College

|-
| style="text-align:left;"| 2018–19
| style="text-align:left;"| Minnesota
| 35 || 31 || 23.8 || .551 || .500 || .615 || 7.0 || .5 || .5 || 1.3 || 10.8
|-
| style="text-align:left;"| 2019–20
| style="text-align:left;"| Minnesota
| 31 || 31 || 33.9 || .563 || .365 || .707 || 11.3 || 1.1 || .5 || 2.5 || 20.1
|- class="sortbottom"
| style="text-align:center;" colspan="2"| Career
| 66 || 62 || 28.5 || .558 || .370 || .671 || 9.0 || .8 || .5 || 1.8 || 15.2

Personal life
Both of Oturu's parents are natives of Nigeria. His mother, Deborah, is from Ife and his father, Francis, is from Fadeyi, a suburb of Lagos. Francis played table tennis for the Nigerian national team and moved to the United States because of his table tennis career. Oturu has an older sister, Eunice. As well as a two younger siblings named David, and Priscilla.

Oturu was given his middle name, Daniel, by his mother, who viewed it as a strong biblical name. His first name, Akinfayoshe, combines the Yoruba words "Akin" (hero) and "fayoshe" (joy and happiness).

Oturu comes from a Christian family. Both of his parents are ministers at a branch of the Mountain of Fire and Miracles Ministries in Saint Paul, Minnesota. His favorite NBA player was Kobe Bryant, and he cites Joel Embiid as a role model.

References

External links

Minnesota Golden Gophers bio

1999 births
Living people
21st-century African-American sportspeople
African-American basketball players
All-American college men's basketball players
American expatriate basketball people in Canada
American men's basketball players
American sportspeople of Nigerian descent
Basketball players from Saint Paul, Minnesota
Centers (basketball)
Los Angeles Clippers players
Minnesota Golden Gophers men's basketball players
Minnesota Timberwolves draft picks
Sportspeople from Brooklyn
Basketball players from New York City
Toronto Raptors players
Windy City Bulls players